Betty Mabel Lilian Uelmen (née Williams; 11 January 1919–6 September 1974) was a British journalist, screenwriter and pulp fiction writer who used the pen names Dail Ambler and Danny Spade. She was also known professionally as both Betty Williams and Betty Uelmen.

Life 
She was born in Aldershot in Hampshire and worked as a Fleet Street journalist and correspondent before settling on a career in fiction writing. By 1950, she was publishing at least one novel a month under the Danny Spade name for pulp paperback publisher Scion Ltd; she later wrote for Milestone Publications. Her writing style and content was somewhat influenced by Mickey Spillane. After the boom in pulp fiction in the United Kingdom ended in the mid-1950s, she turned to screenwriting under the Dail Ambler name. She later lapsed into semi-retirement in Surrey, where she died at the age of 55.

She is buried under the name Dail Ambler in North Watford Cemetery in Watford, Hertfordshire.

Selected work

Books 
 The Dame Plays Rough (1950) by Danny Spade
 Waterfront Rat (1951) by Danny Spade
 Calling Mr. Spade (1952) by Danny Spade
 The Lady Says When (1952) by Dail Ambler
 Honey, You Slay Me (1953) by Danny Spade
 White Curves and Black Coffee (1953) by Danny Spade
 The Virgin Collector (1971) by Dail Ambler
 Three Men for the Job (1975) by Dail Ambler (posthumous)

Film 
 Beat Girl (1960), directed by Edmond T. Gréville
 Take Me Over (1963), directed by Robert Lynn
 Night after Night after Night (1969), directed by Lindsay Shonteff

Television 
 two scripts for Armchair Theatre
 The Pillars of Midnight (1958)
 Murder in Slow Motion (1958)
 one episode for Harpers West One (1961)

References

External links 
 

1919 births
1974 deaths
English crime fiction writers
English women novelists
Pseudonymous women writers
Writers from Aldershot
English journalists
20th-century English screenwriters
20th-century English women writers
20th-century pseudonymous writers